Ghost Stories is an American horror anthology television series that originally aired from 1997 to 1998 on the cable channel FOX Family.

The following is a list of episodes for the television series. During the series run there was a total of 44 episodes.

Episodes

See also
 List of ghost films

References 
 New Dominion Pictures  episode guide
 TV.com  episode listing

Ghost Stories episodes, List of